Live – För dig is a live album from 2001 by the Swedish musician Lars Winnerbäck. In addition to the live recordings, the album contains the new song, "För dig", which was released as a single in September 2001.

Track listing
Elden
I Stockholm
Gråa dagar
En svår och jobbig grej
Sen du var här
Nån annan
Hugger i sten
Varning för ras
Kom ihåg mig
Solen i ögonen
Du hade tid
Kom änglar
Röda laäppar
För dig

Personnel
Lars Winnerbäck – vocals, guitar
Johan Persson – guitar, harmonica, backing vocals
Idde Schultz – guitar, backing vocals 
Anna Stadling – guitar, backing vocals 
Josef Zackrisson – bass guitar, guitar, backing vocals 
Norpan Eriksson – drums, percussion
Jens Back – piano, organ, saxophone
Staffan Andersson – guitar, mandolin

Lars Winnerbäck albums
2001 live albums
Swedish-language live albums
Universal Records live albums